Jukka Markus "Zarkus" Poussa (12 July 1975 – 24 January 2016) was a Finnish musician. He was a member of the groups Giant Robot, RinneRadio, Hemma Beast and Anna-Mari Kähärän Orkesteri. He was known for using humor in his songs and performances. He was also the musician in the television show W-tyyli, and in 2007 he appeared in the series Jokainen vieras on laulun arvoinen. He died suddenly in January 2016 at the age of 40.

References

External links
 
 Huudetaan, music video (awarded honorary mention at OMVF)

Finnish male musicians
2016 deaths
Finnish percussionists
1975 births